Jonathon Ross (born 3 November 1973) is a former Australian rules footballer in the Australian Football League. He played with the Adelaide Crows.

A well-built, strong key position player, Jonathon Ross had the potential to go far. However, his career was hampered by knee injuries and off-field drama and after playing 12 games in his debut season (1992) he managed just eight more games in the next four years. He was offered a chance at Collingwood but lost his place for disciplinary reasons.

Ross was sacked by the Magpies after being charged with unlawful assault, being drunk in a public place, four counts of assaulting police and resisting arrest shortly after arriving at the club.

He is the son of former St Kilda player Lester Ross.

References

1973 births
Living people
Australian rules footballers from South Australia
Adelaide Football Club players
Norwood Football Club players